John Rolfe is a British former sports shooter.

Sports shooting career
Rolfe represented England and won a bronze medal in the 25 metres rapid fire pistol pairs with Brian Girling, at the 1990 Commonwealth Games in Auckland, New Zealand.

References

Living people
British male sport shooters
Shooters at the 1990 Commonwealth Games
Commonwealth Games medallists in shooting
Commonwealth Games bronze medallists for England
Year of birth missing (living people)
Medallists at the 1990 Commonwealth Games